Jane Jepkosgei Kiptoo (born 8 August 1982) is a Kenyan long-distance runner who mainly competes in road running events, up to the marathon distance. She was a team silver medallist in the short race at the 2002 IAAF World Cross Country Championships – her only international selection for Kenya. She also competed in track running in the 2008 season and was third in the 3000 metres at the 2008 IAAF World Athletics Final, and also eight in the 5000 metres in a lifetime best time of 15:03.80 minutes.

She began competing in European road races in 2000. Her achievements include wins at the Groet Uit Schoorl Run (2003), U.S. 10K Classic (2003), Stadsloop Appingedam (2003), Humarathon (2008) and Stramilano (2010). She has had top three finishes at the Zwitserloot Dak Run, Marseille-Cassis Classique Internationale, Olomouc Half Marathon, Puy-en-Velay 15K, Crim Festival of Races, Lisbon Half Marathon, and Cooper River Bridge Run. Kiptoo made her debut over the marathon distance in 2013 and won the Geneva Marathon in 2015 and 2016. In 2008 she won the Aranda de Duero Cross de la Constitucion and Cross Internacional de Soria cross country races in Spain.

International competitions

References

External links

1982 births
Living people
Kenyan female long-distance runners
Kenyan female cross country runners
Kenyan female marathon runners